The International Association of Black Professional Firefighters (IABPFF), founded in 1970, is a fraternal organization of black firefighters.  It represents more than 8000 fire service personnel throughout the United States, Canada, and the Caribbean, organized in 180 chapters.

History

In September 1969, black and minority fire fighters of all ranks from municipalities across the United States met in New York City for two days of discussion on various problems and injustices affecting African-American firefighters: the recruitment of black youth into the fire service, firefighters-community relations with special emphasis on relations with the residents of neighborhoods inhabited by blacks, inter-group relations and practices in fire departments, and the need to improve fire prevention programs in the areas of greatest need. The meeting resulted in the founding of the International Association of Black Professional Fire Fighters. In October 1970, the first convention of Black Professional Fire Fighters was held in Hartford, Connecticut. The IABPFF is currently led by President Carrie Edwards-Clemons.

Chapters

Southwest Region

Northeast Region Vulcan Society, The Valiants, Vulcan Blazers, Phoenix Society, Boston Society of Vulcans

Southeast Region Brothers and Sisters Combined 

Central Region The Stentorians, Black Firefighters Association

Medals

IABPFF Medal of Honor 
The IABPFF Medal of Honor was established to honor those members whom through their contributions in leadership and activism, mentorship and dedication to the ideals of the IABPFF, is both constant and unyielding. In 2017, IABPFF conferred its Medal of Honor Award to retired NYFD Lt. Ormond Smith. He served the Vulcan Society and the IABPFF in service to these ideals.

Medal of Valor

The IABPFF Medal of Valor was established to recognize acts upholding the best qualities and aspirations of the professional fire and rescue service.
Medal of Valor recipients include:

 Brenda Denise Cowan was Lexington, Kentucky's first black female firefighter and died in the line of duty on February 13, 2004. According to Women in the Fire Service, Lieutenant Cowan is the first black female career firefighter ever to die in the line of duty. She had served with the Lexington Fire Department for twelve years. She was on her first tour of duty after being promoted when the call came for a domestic dispute with injuries.  As a result of her line of duty death, the Kentucky senate passed the Brenda D. Cowan Act, Senate Bill 217, unanimously in March 2005. The bill would amend KRS 508.025, relating to assault in the third degree, to provide that a person is guilty of assault in the third degree when he causes or attempts to cause physical injury to emergency medical services personnel, organized fire department members, and rescue squad personnel.
 Daryl Gordon was a firefighter with the Cincinnati Fire Department and died while responding to a fire in Madison, falling down an elevator shaft while responding to a fire in which one other firefighter was injured. His funeral was attended by firefighters from across the country.

Motto

The IABPFF also celebrates and recognizes our leadership as an organization who had the courage and vision to “speak truth to power”
over the many decades we “kept the fire burning for Justice” to quote Capt. David J. Floyd, the IABPFF founding president.

Consent decrees
In cities where blacks came to achieve an absolute political majority – such as Baltimore, Newark, Gary, Cleveland, and Washington, D.C. – threats of lawsuits forced the integration of those fire departments. Integration and black and minority hiring in those cities while stormy, went ahead. The IABFF played a role in the lawsuits that dotted the landscape in the 70's and 80's.

Once chapters were organized around the country, legal avenues were opened to force diversity. In other cities integration of the fire services were not the case, notably Boston('75), Birmingham('81), Miami('77), Memphis('74, '80), San Francisco('70), Chicago, Omaha, Austin, St. Louis ('75), Hartford and Los Angeles('74); where consent decrees forced ‘quotas’ to be imposed in hiring firefighters to mostly white departments due to a lack of political capital to properly integrate them. This political isolation of blacks during the era of fiscal austerity in the 1970s was a direct cause of the elimination of the gains made in fire service up until then by blacks and minorities. As the consent decrees were implemented, fiscal cutbacks forced those last hired to be fired in deference to seniority rules, prompting a new round of lawsuits. Boston suffered from the imposition of a state tax law derived from ‘Proposition 2½’ which caused the elimination of some 200 black firefighters until the layoffs were reversed by funds directly acquired by the city to re-hire them. NYC used the 1975 fiscal crisis to not proceed with court-ordered hiring of black firefighters as a result of a ruling in a 1973 lawsuit filed by the Vulcan Society. Around the country various ploys to prevent blacks from being hired as firefighters were disguised as fiscal austerity to provide cover for politicians who had no allegiance to nor fear of voter backlash from the minority communities which disproportionately suffered from firehouse closings. For example, black and Puerto Rican neighborhoods in NYC saw 27 firehouses closed in the early 1970s, resulting in an epidemic of building fires, leading to some areas within those neighborhoods losing 80% of the housing stock, which in turn led to overcrowding in adjacent areas followed by a diffusion of the chaos and more fires and loss of housing in those areas. This chain reaction saw social collapse and vast areas turned into urban deserts wholly lacking a normal community life. Despite the havoc the cuts had on those communities, they were never rescinded. Only minorities with no political representation were affected, effectively segregated and politically marginalized, preventing them from finding allies to oppose the reductions in service to their districts. If this seems a relic of past discrimination fights, the Aughts proved this not to be the case. With nepotism an issue, the makeup of many firehouses still remains a profession passed from father to sons, barring lawsuits to force integration of minorities and women they continue to remain the same as they were in the 1970s era of consent decrees.

Current litigation

FDNY - NYC Under court-ordered monitoring Currently hiring from a preferred list condensed from those minorities who passed all tests relevant to hiring and were on the 1999, 2002, and 2007 lists.

AFD - Austin, Tx Consent decree in final stage litigation Plaintiffs AAAFA decries The Department of Justice in the implementation of the decree, and the most recent rushed resolution by the city council, which is allowing local 975(AFA) to be involved in the diversity hiring process. The AAAFA being the party involved in bringing the lawsuit, argued that the Federal consent decree trumps and overrides any state code so that the AFA (Local 975) request to enjoin the discussions is deleterious to the process. To be clear, they stated before the Austin City Council, the facts are that the state does not allow Local 975 to be involved in the implementation of the consent decree, and we, the AAAFA are saying they do not need to be involved with it as well. Finally, the best AFD hiring process that had the most diversity was in 2005 (which Local 975 helped to cancel), not 2012 or 2013. The AAAFA organization's mission is the serve both Firefighters, our department, and the Austin community. In opposition, members of the Austin Firefighters Association say they are ready to work with city leaders. “We’re the employee group, and nobody knows how to hire better firefighters than the employees themselves,” said AFA President Bob Nicks in response to the criticism. However, the judge ruled in favor of the AAAFA.

References

Further reading
 Douglas S. Massey and Nancy A. Denton, American Apartheid: Segregation and the making of the underclass, Harvard University Press, 1993
Repository citation (for consent decrees)

 Susan B. Dorfman, "Mandatory Consent: Binding Unrepresented Third Parties Through Consent Decrees", 78 Marquette Law Review 153 (1994)

External links
Recruitment - http://iabpffrecruit.com/

Professional associations based in the United States
Government-related professional associations
Ethnic fraternal orders in the United States
African-American firefighting organizations
Post–civil rights era in African-American history